Whitney Osborn McVeigh (born 1968) is an American multimedia artist living and working in London. Born in New York City, she grew up in London from the age of seven.

Early life

McVeigh is the daughter of Pamela Osborn and Charles McVeigh III, an American banker. She attended Bedales School from 1980 to 1985. Whilst studying for a BA at Edinburgh College of Art from 1995 to 1998, McVeigh ran a funk, reggae, and rare groove night club named 'Chocolate City' with her then boyfriend Jamie Byng, publisher and managing director of Canongate Books, whom she married in 1996 and with whom she has two children, Leo and Marley. Byng and McVeigh separated in 2001.

Exhibitions
Whitney McVeigh has travelled extensively to carry out her practice and has held residencies in India, Brazil, Mexico, China and the Nirox Foundation in South Africa. McVeigh considers herself an autobiographical artist. Exhibitions include Plato in L.A.: Contemporary Artists' Visions at the Getty Villa, Los Angeles  Inventory: Invisible Companion at St Peter's Church, Kettle's Yard, Cambridge., solo project at the Gervasuti Foundation for the 55th Venice Biennale Hunting Song. and New Work at the A Foundation, London (2009).

McVeigh made a film-based artwork during a trip to Syria to create Sight of Memory, screened in Icastica Arezzo 2013.  In 2015, she produced a film in collaboration with Pulse Films. 'Birth': Origins at the end of life' shown at the Reynolds Room at Royal Academy  as part of an annual event with St Christopher's. McVeigh exhibited Language of Memory at Summerhall Arts Centre, Edinburgh in 2015–16. In 2009 she was featured in BBC Four Where is Modern Art Now. From 2014-2019, McVeigh was Fellow in Creative Practice at London College of Fashion.

References 

Artists from New York (state)
1968 births
Living people
American emigrants to England
20th-century American painters
21st-century American painters
20th-century English painters
21st-century English painters
People educated at Bedales School
Alumni of the Edinburgh College of Art
20th-century American women artists
21st-century American women artists
American women painters